Joseph Jackson Hadfield (August 24, 1844 – May 18, 1894) was an American businessman and politician.

Born in Waukesha, Wisconsin, Hadfield was a wool dealer and was in the real estate business. From 1873 to 1880, Hadfield lived in Ottumwa, Iowa. In 1882, Hadfield was elected trustee of the village of Waukesha and then became president of the village. In 1887, Hadfield served in the Wisconsin State Assembly and was a Democrat. Hadfield died of cancer in Waukesha, Wisconsin.

Notes

1844 births
1894 deaths
People from Ottumwa, Iowa
Politicians from Waukesha, Wisconsin
Businesspeople from Wisconsin
Wisconsin city council members
Mayors of places in Wisconsin
Deaths from cancer in Wisconsin
19th-century American politicians
19th-century American businesspeople
Democratic Party members of the Wisconsin State Assembly